

198001–198100 

|-bgcolor=#f2f2f2
| colspan=4 align=center | 
|}

198101–198200 

|-id=110
| 198110 Heathrhoades ||  || Heath Rhoades (born 1972), the computer network administrator at the Table Mountain Observatory in California || 
|}

198201–198300 

|-bgcolor=#f2f2f2
| colspan=4 align=center | 
|}

198301–198400 

|-bgcolor=#f2f2f2
| colspan=4 align=center | 
|}

198401–198500 

|-id=450
| 198450 Scattolin ||  || Patrice Scattolin (born 1965) is one of the foremost amateur observers in Canada. || 
|}

198501–198600 

|-id=592
| 198592 Antbernal || 2005 AK || Antonio Bernal (born 1947), Colombian ex-director of the planetarium in Medellín and a charter member of the Astronomical Colombian Network (RAC) || 
|}

198601–198700 

|-id=616
| 198616 Lucabracali ||  || Luca Bracali (born 1965), an Italian photographer and journalist. || 
|-id=634
| 198634 Burgaymarta ||  || Marta Burgay (born 1976), an Italian radio astronomer who discovered the first known binary pulsar, PSR J0737−3039 || 
|-id=673
| 198673 Herrero ||  || Enrique ("Kike") Herrero Casas (born 1986) is an astrophysicist at the Institut d'Estudis Espacials de Catalunya (IEEC) and is also a science communicator. He specializes in exoplanets and stellar astrophysics. || 
|-id=700
| 198700 Nataliegrünewald ||  || Natalie Grünewald (born 1970), daughter of German amateur astronomer Rolf Apitzsch who discovered this minor planet || 
|}

198701–198800 

|-id=717
| 198717 Szymczyk ||  || Bill Szymczyk (born 1943) is an American music producer and audio engineer. || 
|}

198801–198900 

|-id=820
| 198820 Iwanowska ||  || Wilhelmina Iwanowska (1905–1999), Polish astronomer, Vice-President of the IAU in the 1970s, and first astrophysics professor in Poland || 
|}

198901–199000 

|-id=993
| 198993 Epoigny ||  || Epoigny, a site in Burgundy, France, near the Le Creusot Observatory. The location's name is derived from Epona, the goddess of horses in the Gallo-Roman religion. || 
|}

References 

198001-199000